KILT ("SportsRadio 610") is a commercial AM radio station in Houston, Texas. The station is owned by Audacy, Inc. and carries a sports radio format.  KILT shares its call sign with its sister station KILT-FM (100.3 FM), which airs a country music radio format. Its studios are located in the Greenway Plaza district.

It uses a directional antenna at all times. The transmitter is on West Road at Ella Boulevard in North Houston. Programming is also heard on co-owned KILT-FM's HD2 sub-channel.

Programming
On weekdays, KILT has local hosts from morning drive time through the evening, with CBS Sports Radio syndicated national programming heard late nights and weekends.  KILT is the flagship station of the NFL's Houston Texans and the MLS' Houston Dynamo. It has aired every Texans game since the team's inception into the league in 2002.

History

KLEE
610 AM signed on the air on January 31, 1948.  It was owned by W. Albert Lee. The station chose the call sign KLEE to reflect the owner's name.  The studios were in the Milby Hotel, which Lee owned.

The following year, Lee added a television station, KLEE-TV.  It was Houston's first television station and the second one in Texas.  Lee sold KLEE-TV to the Hobby Family in 1950, owners of the Houston Post daily newspaper, but he kept his radio station since the Post already owned KPRC (950 AM). (KLEE-TV is now KPRC-TV.)

Gordon McLendon ownership
In 1952, KLEE was sold to Gordon McLendon, who initially changed the call letters to KLBS, to represent his network, the "Liberty Broadcasting System."  McLendon had great success programming Top 40 hits on KLIF in Dallas.  That prompted McLendon to turn other stations in his chain into Top 40 outlets, including AM 610 in Houston, in 1957.

The station took the call letters KILT as a nod to McLendon, who often called himself "The Old Scotsman" on the air.  (Scottish men are known for wearing kilts instead of pants.)  For 24 years, KILT was the leading Top 40 station in Houston, called "The Big 610 KILT". It used PAMS jingles that featured the call letters being sung out over the air. Notable personalities in the 1960s and 1970s included Steve Lundy, Sheila Mayhew, Beau Weaver, Jay West, K.O. Bailey, Barry Kaye, Captain Jack and others.

Flip to Country
On February 16, 1981, sister station KILT-FM dropped album rock for country during the "Urban Cowboy" craze that swept through Houston, and the United States in general.  The AM station continued with its adult Top 40 format. However, in the 1980s, young listeners were increasingly tuning in FM stations to hear their favorite hits.  Competition from KRBE (104.1 FM) and KRLY (93.7 FM) prompted KILT to end its Top 40 format.

On June 1, 1981, KILT switched to country music, partially simulcasting KILT-FM, then known as "FM 100".  Over time, KILT played more classic country titles among current and recent hits, while KILT-FM concentrated on current country music.  KILT AM included more news and features while KILT-FM stressed its more-music approach. In addition, the morning show was heard on both stations.

In 1989, KILT-AM-FM were acquired by Westinghouse Broadcasting.  Westinghouse kept KILT as an AM country station for another five years.  As AM radio declined as a source for music, management decided to make a change.

SportsRadio 610
The current sports-talk format debuted in September 1994. The moniker for the new format was "Star 610 SportsRadio KILT." The initial hosts were Mike Edmonds & Ed Fowler in the afternoon from 4-7 p.m. and the Bob Stevenson Outdoors Show, airing Tuesday-Friday mornings 4am-5am and Saturdays & Sundays from 4am-7am. Prime Sports Radio, based in Dallas, aired for all other hours.

In 1995, Edmonds & Fowler moved to the mornings 6am-9am and Rich Lord & Kenny Hand were paired together for "Section 610" from 4pm-7pm. Lord also hosted the locally produced Astros Clubhouse Extra post-game shows from 1996 to 1998.

In 2001, KILT signed a 10-year agreement with the expansion Houston Texans of the NFL to become their first-ever flagship radio station when the team began play in 2002. Marc Vandermeer was hired as the Voice of the Texans and was also added to the roster of station hosts. Vandermeer teamed with former Heisman Trophy winner Andre Ware on the game broadcasts and Lord, along with his new co-host in afternoon drive, Charlie Pallillo, served as co-host of the Texans first-ever pre-game and post-game shows. In 2007, Lord moved on to a new role, serving seven seasons as the Texans in-game sideline reporter.

Entercom ownership
On February 2, 2017, CBS Radio announced it would merge with Entercom. The merger was approved on November 9, 2017, and was consummated on November 17.

KILT has remained Houston's top rated sports station for most of its history.  Co-owned KIKK (650 AM) carries the CBS Sports Radio Network in the daytime, while KILT runs local sports shows. On late nights and weekends, KILT carries CBS Sports Radio programming.

Past Personalities 

 Seth Payne, host
 Ted Johnson, host 
 Wade Smith, host, 
 Booker T, host
 Clint Stoerner, current afternoon host
 Mike Meltser, host
 Sean Pendergast, host
 Rich Lord, host
 John Lopez, host
 Paul Gallant, host
 Fred Davis, host
 Landry Locker, producer
 Chris Jones, producer
 Brian McDonald, producer
 Figgy Fig, producer
 Laura Reynolds, traffic & assistant program director
 Ryan McCredden, program director
 Shaun Bijani, host
 Derek Fogel, host
 Patrick McLellan, host
 Jeremy Brahnam - Houston Dynamo play-by-play
 Garret Heinrich - Houston Dynamo color analyst
 Brad Wright - digital supervisor
 Bob Presley - Afternoon Drive Time DJ (1958-62, 1963-65)

References

External links
 
 
FCC History Cards for KILT

Sports radio stations in the United States
Radio stations established in 1948
1948 establishments in Texas
ILT (AM)
CBS Sports Radio stations
Audacy, Inc. radio stations